Princess Der Ling, also known as Secret Files of the Qing Imperial Palace: Princess Der Ling, is a Chinese period drama television series based on the historical novel of the same name written by Xu Xiaobin. It is the first and only television dramatisation of Der Ling's life.

Synopsis 
Upon their return to China from France, Der Ling (Zhang Jingjing) and Roung Ling (Sun Yifei), daughters of the Qing-dynasty diplomat  (Liu Wenzhi), are installed as court ladies to the Empress Dowager Cixi (Lü Zhong). The Yu sisters, with the feeling of reforming an ancient empire, eventually realise its impossibility of change, and witness the dynasty's gradual demise. Der Ling's relationship with Kevin White (Jonathan Kos-Read; based on her real-life husband Thaddeus Cohu White) was highly romanticised in the series.

According to the Peking University professor Chen Xiaoming, in Xu Xiaobin's novel, as well in the series adaptation, "Der Ling and Roung Ling are symbols of Western civilisation". Despite being born in the Qing Empire, "they are the messengers of modern Western civilisation rather than daughters of ancient Eastern civilisation. They enter the ancient palace carrying within themselves a modern concept, a modern lifestyle and a modern aesthetic, bringing a free spirit to a society of rigid stratification, which is fresh and more humane."

Cast and characters 

 Zhang Jingjing as Princess Der Ling
 Sun Yifei as Nellie Yu Roung Ling
 Lü Zhong as Empress Dowager Cixi
 Jonathan Kos-Read as Kevin White
 Pam as Amy White
 Sylvia as Katharine Carl
  as John Yu Shuinling
  as 
  as Lady Yu Keng (Louisa Pierson)
 Huang He as Guangxu Emperor
 Yan Zi as Empress consort of Guangxu
 Wang Zi as Consort Jin
  as Li Lianying
 Zhou Yinghong as the 
 Zhang Yajun as Princess Rongshou
 Han Xinmin as Ronglu
 Sun Ning as Wu Tingfang
 Lu Chang'en as Sun Yu
  as Yuan Shikai
 Jia Dazhong as Zhang Zhidong
 Zou Zheng as Xiaowenzi
 Wang Wentao as Xiaoshizi
 Zhang Ge as Musashi
  as Uchida Kōsai
 Yuka Ishizaki as wife of Uchida Kōsai (Uchida Masako)
 Peter as Edwin H. Conger
 Maresa as wife of Edwin H. Conger (Sarah J. Conger)
 Galia as wife of 
 Xing Jun as Consort Yu
 Wang Shuai as Barong

DVD release 
The series was released in a DVD boxset on 7 September 2006. The set includes ten discs containing all the episodes.

References

External links 
  
 

2006 Chinese television series debuts
Biographical television series
Television series based on novels
Television series set in the 1900s
Television series set in the Qing dynasty
Television series about princesses
Mandarin-language television shows
English-language television shows
Fiction about interracial romance
Cultural depictions of Empress Dowager Cixi